The Madhya Kerala Diocese is one of the twenty-four dioceses of the Church of South India (commonly referred to as CSI)  (successor of the Church of England) covering the central part of Kerala. When the Church of South India was formed on 27 September 1947, the diocese was called the Diocese of Central Travancore. It was a part of the erstwhile Anglican Diocese of Travancore and Cochin founded in 1879. The Diocese was later renamed as Diocese of Madhya Kerala.

History 
The history of the Madhya Kerala Diocese dates back to the work of the Church Missionary Society in the state of Travancore. R.H. Kerr and Claudius Buchanan, visited the Malabar Syrians in 1806, during the episcopate of Mar Dionysius I. Lord William Bentinck sent Kerr to Travancore for the purpose of investigating the state of the native church. During the British period, CMS missionaries started a relationship with Saint Thomas Christians; a division occurred between Orthodox Syrian Christians and a minority from the Church, who were in favor of the reformed ideologies of the CMS missionaries. According to some estimates, about 6,000–12,000 Orthodox Syrian Christians joined the Church of England in India in 1837; these were known as Syrian Anglicans.

Early in 1876, the Society began negotiations with the Secretary of State for India so that a new diocese can be formed under the Jerusalem Bishopric Act for the Church of England in the Native States of Travancore and Cochin. The Diocese of Travancore and Cochin (in the Church of India, Burma and Ceylon) was erected with its See at Kottayam in 1879 and John Speechly, then Principal of the Cambridge Nicholson Institute (CMS theological college, Kottayam), was announced as the first Bishop of Travancore and Cochin. Speechly was consecrated a bishop on 25 July 1879 at St Paul's Cathedral; he arrived at Kottayam on 27 January 1880.

In 1888, Speechly left for England and was unable to return, and Noel Hodges (1890–1904), a CMS Missionary from Ceylon followed him as diocesan bishop. He was installed in the Pro-Cathedral, Kottayam in November 1890. During the episcopate of Hodges, the first missionary enterprise of the diocese was organised as its Home Mission, was started at Adoor in 1903. Hodges retired in 1905 and was succeeded by Hope Gill (1905–1925), who was consecrated in Westminster Abbey and arrived in Kottayam in 1906. The full creation of Diocesan structures which began in 1879 was fulfilled in 1920, when Gill constituted, "Travancore and Cochin Diocesan Council" to assist in the management of the temporal affairs and financial business of the church.

On 27 September 1947, the four southernmost dioceses of CIBC united with other churches to form the Church of South India. The presiding bishop at the CSI's inauguration was C. K. Jacob, Bishop of Travancore and Cochin who became Bishop in Central Travancore; his diocese's territory was reduced and renamed the Diocese of Central Travancore. Subsequently, it has been renamed the Diocese of Madhya Kerala after that state was formed in 1956 — madhya is Hindi for central.

Due to the presence of Syrian Anglicans in the CSI, churches of Malankara Orthodox Syrian Church (in Oriental Orthodox Communion, autocephalous), Malankara Jacobite Syriac Orthodox Church (in Oriental Orthodox Communion, under Antioch) and Malankara Mar Thoma Syrian Church do interact frequently  on occasions such as family gathering and marriages.

Administration 
The Diocese has a Diocesan Council which governs the diocese. All the clergy of the diocese and elected laymen from the local congregations are the members of the Diocesan Council.

The diocese is divided into two zones (North Zone and South Zone), each headed by a District Minister. And it is further divided into twelve District Councils. The bishop of the diocese is assisted by the Executive Committee, formed by an election from the Diocesan Council.

The Diocesan Headquarters is at Kottayam, Kerala. The Bishop's House and a Retreat Centre is in the campus of the Headquarters.

The Diocese also publishes an official newsletter named Njananikshepam (The Treasury of Knowledge) every month. The newsletter was published first in the year 1848 from C.M.S. press, Kottayam.

Bishops 

Anglican Bishops of Travancore and Cochin
John Speechly (1879–1889)
Noel Hodges (1890–1904)
Hope Gill (1905–1924)
Edward Moore (1925–1937)
Bernard Corfield (1938–1944)
Cherakarottu Korula Jacob (1945–1947)
CSI Bishops in Central Travancore/Madhya Kerala
 C.K. Jacob (1947–1957)
 M.M. John (1958–1974)
 T.S. Joseph, assistant bishop (consecrated 1 July 1967)
 T.S. Joseph (1974–1981) installed 27 December
 M.C. Mani (1981–1993) consecrated 8 February
 Sam Mathew (1993–2001) consecrated 1 September
 Thomas Samuel (2001–2011)
 Thomas K Oommen (2011–2020)
 Sabu Koshy Cherian (2021-Till date)

District Councils 
The Diocese is divided into 12 District Councils. Each Council has a chairman presbyter.

Institutions under the diocese 
Ashram
Bethel Ashram, Thiruvalla
Printing Press
C.M.S. Press, Kottayam (The first printing press in Kerala, established in 1821)
Weaving School
C.M.S WEAVING SCHOOL,Tholassery,Thiruvalla
Colleges
CMS College Kottayam (The first college in Kerala, established in 1817)
Peet Memorial Training College Mavelikara
Bishop Moore College Mavelikara
Bishop Speechly College Pallom
CSI College for Legal Studies, Ettumanoor
Baker Women's College, Kottayam
CSI College for Advanced Studies Punnakkad, Kozhencherry
Higher Secondary Schools
Baker Memorial Girls Higher Secondary School, Kottayam
Bishop Hodges Higher Secondary School Mavelikara
CMS Higher Secondary School Mallapally
CMS College Higher Secondary Kottayam
CMS Higher Secondary Kuzhikala
High Schools
CMS College Higher Secondary School Kottayam
Baker Memorial Girls High School, Kottayam
Bishop Hodges Higher Secondary School Mavelikara
CMS Higher Secondary School Mallapally
CMS Higher Secondary Kuzhikala
Buchanan Girls High School Pallom
CMS High School Mundakayam
CMS High School Kattanam
CMS High School Kumplampoika
CMS High School Nedugadapally
CMS High School Pallom
CMS High School Punnavely
CMS High School Olassa
CMS High School Puthupally
CMS High School Kanam
CMS High School Thiruvalla
CMS High School Thalavady
CMS High School Mundiapally
Theological Education
Bishop Mani Theological Institute Kottayam
Self Financing Schools
Baker Vidyapith Kottayam
Bishop Moore Vidyapith Mavelikara
Bishop Moore English Medium Higher Secondary School Mavelikara
Bishop Moore Vidyapith Cherthala
Bishop Moore Vidyapith Kayamkulam
Bishop Speechly Vidyapith Pallom
Christ Church Vidyapith Kodukulanji
Hawksworth Vidyapith Tholassery
Teacher Training Institutes
B.I.T.T.I, Pallom
C.N.I.T.T.I, Kottayam
Special Schools
 C.S.I VHSS for the Deaf, Thiruvalla
 C.S.I HSS for the Partially Hearing, Manakkala, Adoor

Notable churches 
Within Kerala
Holy Trinity CSI Cathedral, Kottayam
St.Joseph CSI Church, Poovathoor
St.Peter's CSI Church, Puthuppally
CSI Ascension Church Kottayam
CSI Christ Church, Thiruvananthapuram
St. Stephen's CSI Church Pariyaram Mallappally
CSI Christ Church, Alappuzha
CSI Christ Church, Mavelikkara
CSI Christ Church, Kodukulanji
St. Paul's CSI Church, Ranni
St. Johns CSI Church Neelampara Karukachal
Transfiguration CSI Church, Varikkad Thiruvalla
Holy Trinity CSI Church Mundakayam
St. Thomas CSI Church, Tholassery  Thiruvalla
St. Thomas CSI Church, Punnakadu
Holy Immanuel CSI Church, Mallappally
CSI Christ Church, Kaviyoor
St. Andrew's CSI Church, Kozhuvalloor
CSI St .Andrew's Church Kumplampoika
CSI St. Thomas' Church, Nedungadappally
St. Thomas CSI Church, Thalavady
CSI St. Stephen's Church, Puthuval
CSI St. Marks Church, Olassa
CSI St. Stephen's Church, Mundiappally
CSI St. John The Baptist church, Pallom
CSI St.Pauls Chuch ,Nalunnakkal
Holy Trinity C.S.I Church, Alumpeedika
Outside India
Canada
CSI Church, Toronto
UK
Church Of South India (CSI) Malayalam Congregation, London
ST Thomas CSI Church, Belfast
CSI Congregation of Manchester, Midlands and Sheffield.
Kuwait
St. Peter's CSI Church
St. Paul’s CSI Church, Ahmadi
Qatar
CSI St.Thomas Church -Malayalam Congregation, Doha - Qatar
UAE
 CSI Parish, Abu Dhabi
CSI Parish, Dubai
CSI Parish, Sharjah
All Saints CSI Parish, Jebel Ali
USA
Immanuel CSI Church, New Jersey 
CSI Emmanuel Congregation, Atlanta
CSI Congregation of Great Lakes, Michigan
Emmanuel CSI Church, Philadelphia
CSI Congregation of Dallas
CSI Congregation of Hudson Valley
Church of South India Malayalam Congregation of Greater New York
Australia
Holy Trinity CSI Church, Brisbane
Ireland
Holy Trinity CSI Congregation, Dublin

Gallery

See also 
Church of South India
East Kerala Diocese
South Kerala Diocese
North Kerala Diocese
Christianity in Kerala

References

External links 
CSI Madhya Kerala Diocese Website
CSI Madhya Kerala Diocese
CSI South Kerala Diocese
Church of North India
CSI Ascension Church Kottayam
CSI Christ Church Trivandrum
CSI Christ Church Kodukulanji
Bethel Malayalam Church Delhi
CSI Chennai Diocese
Delhi Malayalam Congregation
CSI St.Johns Church Secunderabad
CSI Wesley Church Hyderabad
CSI Church Pune
CSI Immanuel Congregation Singapore
CSI Church in Australia
CSI Church Mundiappally
CSI Church Los Angeles
 Some members of Malankara Syriac Orthodox joined the Anglican Church.

Dioceses in Kerala
Madhya Kerala
Religious organizations established in 1879
1879 establishments in India
Anglican bishops of Travancore and Cochin
Church of India, Burma and Ceylon